Thomas Ulick Sadleir (15 September 1882 – 21 December 1957) was an Irish genealogist and heraldic expert. He was successively registrar of the Order of St Patrick, Deputy Ulster King of Arms and Acting Ulster King of Arms.

Career
Sadleir's first involvement with the office of arms at Dublin Castle was when he worked on an unpaid basis whilst an undergraduate at Trinity College, Dublin. He graduated in 1904, and was called to the bar in 1906.

By 1913, he was working on a daily basis at the office, whilst practising as a barrister. In 1915 he was appointed registrar of the Order of St Patrick by George Dames Burtchaell, Deputy Ulster King of Arms. In practice, Sadleir carried out most of the day-to-day work of Ulster's office.

In 1915, Sadleir wrote an unofficial 6th volume of the annual Georgian Society Records called "Georgian mansions in Ireland" along with Page Dickinson. It proved to be the last volume of the society's annual records until it was re-established as the modern Irish Georgian Society in 1958.

In August 1921, Burtchaell was killed in a tram accident, and in September, Sadleir was appointed Deputy to Major Sir Neville Wilkinson, Ulster King of Arms. As Major Wilkinson was almost always absent from Dublin, Sadleir performed most of the duties of the office.

The Office of Arms was unaffected by the creation of the Irish Free State in December 1922, continuing to cover the whole of the island of Ireland, and remaining based in Dublin Castle.

In December 1940, Major Wilkinson died, and the Government of Ireland requested that no successor be appointed. For the next three years, Sadleir was Acting Ulster King of Arms. In 1943, the Government of Ireland established the Genealogical Office, which took over the records of the Office of Arms, while the title of Ulster King of Arms was merged with that of Norroy to become Norroy and Ulster King of Arms, a member of the College of Arms in London.

Sadleir continued to work for the Genealogical Office until 1944, clearing the large backlog of grants and confirmations of arms that had built up in Ulster's office. After leaving the G.O., he continued his private genealogical practice. He maintained links with his former employer, however, remaining a trustee of the Heraldic Museum in Dublin until his death.

Sadleir subsequently became librarian at the King's Inns in Dublin, a post he held until his death.

On 29 August 1922 he married Anna Elizabeth Norman ("Norma"), daughter of Dr James and Anna Kenny of Killeshandra, County Cavan, with whom he had two sons, Randal and Digby.

Sadleir died at his home on Marlborough Road, Dublin on 21 December 1957, and was buried at Castleknock church, Dublin.

Arms

See also
 Athlone Pursuivant

References

Sources

External links

Letters of Thomas Ulick Sadleir, 1893-1958 Genealogical Office, National Library of Ireland

1882 births
1957 deaths
Irish genealogists
Irish barristers
Irish officers of arms
Georgian architecture in Ireland